Yung Yau is currently the Associate Professor of Housing Studies in the Department of Public Policy, City University of Hong Kong.

He obtained his bachelor degree in surveying and PhD degree from the Department of Real Estate and Construction, the University of Hong Kong. His PhD supervisors were Prof. Daniel Chi-wing Ho and Prof. Kwong-wing Chau. His PhD research is about assessment of building safety performance of private multi-storey residential buildings in Hong Kong.

Yau has won the following awards:
 American Society of Civil Engineers 2016 Outstanding Reviewer Award;
 Emerald 2016 Literati Award;
 American Society of Civil Engineers 2015 Outstanding Reviewer Award;
 American Society of Civil Engineers 2014 Outstanding Reviewer Award;
 Best Conference Paper Award in the Pacific Rim Real Estate Society Conference 2013;
 Li Ka Shing Prize 2007; and
 Hong Kong Institute of Architects Annual Awards 2006 (Architectural Research).

References

External links
Faculty page at the City University of Hong Kong

Living people
Academic staff of the City University of Hong Kong
Year of birth missing (living people)
Hong Kong civil engineers